The Ginninderra electorate is one of the five electorates for the unicameral 25-member Australian Capital Territory Legislative Assembly. It elects five members.

History
It was created in 1995, when the three-electorate, Hare-Clark electoral system was first introduced for the Australian Capital Territory (ACT). Prior to 1995, a multi-member single constituency existed for the whole of the ACT. The name "Ginninderra" is derived from an Aboriginal word meaning "sparkling like the stars". It is the name given to the creek that flows through the middle of Belconnen, which was dammed to form Lake Ginninderra, the lake on which the Belconnen Town Centre is sited.

Location
The Ginninderra electorate comprises the southern part of the district of Belconnen, including the suburbs of Aranda, Belconnen, Bruce, Charnwood, Cook, Dunlop, Evatt, Florey, Flynn, Fraser, Hawker, Higgins, Holt, Latham, Lawson, Macgregor, Macnamara, Macquarie, Melba, McKellar, Page, Scullin, Spence, Strathnairn and Weetangera.

Two Belconnen suburbs, Giralang and Kaleen are part of Yerrabi.

From 1995 to 2001 it contained the Canberra districts of Belconnen and Hall. After the 2001 redistribution the Gungahlin suburb of Nicholls was moved to the electorate. The 2008 redistribution made no changes to the boundaries of the electorate.

In the 2012 redistribution the Gungahlin suburbs of Crace and Palmerston were moved from Molonglo into Ginninderra.

In the 2016 redistribution, all three Gungahlin suburbs, the village of Hall, and the Belconnen suburbs of Evatt, Giralang, Kaleen, Lawson and McKellar were transferred into the new Yerrabi electorate. At the 2020 redistribution, the suburbs of Evatt, Lawson and McKellar were transferred back into Ginninderra.

Members 

1 Jon Stanhope (Labor) resigned from the Assembly on 16 May 2011. Chris Bourke (Labor) was elected as his replacement on a countback on 30 May 2011.
2 Mary Porter (Labor) resigned from the Assembly on 19 February 2016. Jayson Hinder (Labor) was elected as her replacement on a countback on 7 March 2016.

See also
 Australian Capital Territory Electoral Commission
 Australian Capital Territory Legislative Assembly

References

External links
 ACT Electoral Commission
 ACT Legislative Assembly - List of Members (1989 - 2008)

Electorates of the Australian Capital Territory